Nannarup is a genus of soil centipedes in the family Mecistocephalidae; this genus includes a single species, Nannarrup hoffmani, commonly known as Hoffman's dwarf centipede, which was discovered in New York City's Central Park in 2002. It is 10 mm long, and has 82 legs. Researchers think that the species originated in East Asia and was carried to the United States in a shipment of imported plants. The species is the first new species to be discovered in Central Park in more than a century. It is the smallest known species of centipede. The species is named after Dr. Richard L. Hoffman, former curator of invertebrates at the Virginia Museum of Natural History, for his role in helping to identify the species.

References

External links 
 

Geophilomorpha
Animals described in 2003
Fauna of the Northeastern United States
Central Park
Monotypic arthropod genera